Sundsvall–Timrå Airport  is about 21 km north of Sundsvall, 8 km east of Timrå and 32 km south of Härnösand, Sweden. The airport is also known as Midlanda, referring to its geographically central location in Sweden. The airport was known under the name Sundsvall–Härnösand Airport until the municipalities of Sundsvall and Timrå (but not Härnösand) obtained the ownership of the airport from Swedavia on June 17, 2013. Sundsvall–Timrå Airport is Norrland's sixth-busiest airport and Sweden's fifteenth busiest. The airport counted 282,047 passengers in 2011 and 273,527 in 2018.

It was built on delta land formed by much sediment and flood debris that washed down the Indalsälven river to the sea when the lake Ragundasjön drained suddenly and catastrophically in June 1796. The airport was inaugurated on 11 September 1944.

Sundsvall airport has Swedens first centre for remote control towers. Four airports have their ground movements surveillied from an office building with camera view only. These four airports are Örnsköldsvik, Linköping, Sälen and Sundsvall itself.

Airlines and destinations

Passenger
The following airlines operate regular scheduled and charter flights at Sundsvall–Timrå Airport:

Cargo

Statistics

Accidents 
On December 12, 1999, a Piper PA-31 Navajo crashed shortly after takeoff. It hit a hill in bad visibility. All eight onboard died (pilot and seven passengers). This was not a regular flight, but a taxi flight with paying passengers.

See also 
List of the largest airports in the Nordic countries

References

External links

Google Earth air view of Sundsvall–Härnösand Airport, showing its place in a river's delta

Airports in Sweden
Sundsvall
Buildings and structures in Sundsvall Municipality
Airports established in 1944
1944 establishments in Sweden
International airports in Sweden